Jason Tyler Candle (born November 12, 1979) is an American football coach who is currently the head football coach at the University of Toledo. He had been an assistant at Toledo since 2009, and at Mount Union before that. Candle played wide receiver at Mount Union and Geneva.

Playing career 
Candle was born in Salem, Ohio. He played wide receiver, first at Geneva College (1998–1999) and then at Mount Union (2000–2001). Both Mount Union teams he played on won the Division III championship. Candle graduated from Mount Union in 2003.

Coaching career 
After graduating, Candle stayed on at Mount Union and joined the coaching staff as the wide receivers coach, a job he held from 2003–2006. In 2007, Mount Union promoted him to offensive coordinator, replacing Matt Campbell, who had joined the staff at Bowling Green.

Toledo 
Candle left Mount Union in 2009 to become the slot receivers/tight ends coach at Toledo under Tim Beckman. He was reunited there with Campbell, then serving as run game coordinator. Toledo promoted Candle to wide receivers coach in 2010, where he coached All-American Eric Page. Toledo promoted Campbell to head coach at the end of 2011 after Beckman became head coach at the University of Illinois. Campbell retained Candle and promoted him to offensive coordinator. Candle added the title of associate head coach in 2014.

Toledo named Candle as their head coach on December 2, 2015, after Campbell departed for Iowa State University. On July 22, 2020, Toledo announced that Candle has tested positive for COVID-19 despite being asymptomatic. He became the first publicly known FBS coach to have tested positive for coronavirus.

Head coaching record

References

External links
 Toledo Rockets bio

1979 births
Living people
American football wide receivers
Geneva Golden Tornadoes football players
Mount Union Purple Raiders football coaches
Mount Union Purple Raiders football players
Toledo Rockets football coaches
People from Salem, Ohio